Testosterone propionate/testosterone cypionate/prasterone (TP/TC/DHEA), sold under the brand name Sten, is an injectable combination medication of testosterone propionate (TP), a fast-acting androgen/anabolic steroid, testosterone cypionate (TC), a long-acting androgen/anabolic steroid, and prasterone (dehydroepiandrosterone; DHEA), an androgen and neurosteroid, which has been used to treat andropause, hypogonadism, and impotence in men and breast cancer, fibrocystic breast disease, and low sexual desire in women. It contains 25 mg TP, 75 mg TC, and 20 mg DHEA in 2 mL oil solution provided in ampoules and is administered by intramuscular injection once every 15 to 30 days. The medication was previously marketed in Mexico but appears to no longer available. The duration of action of TP/TC/DHEA has been reported to be approximately 15 to 30 days, due to the long-acting TC component.

See also
 List of combined sex-hormonal preparations § Androgens

References

External links
 Sten — testosterone cypionate & propionate - Steroids World 

Abandoned drugs
Combined androgen formulations